Leo Carrillo State Park is a state park in Los Angeles County, California, United States. Situated along the Malibu coast, the park is a component of Santa Monica Mountains National Recreation Area. With  of beach, the parkland stretches into the Santa Monica Mountains. The park has expanded into Ventura County and also includes management of County Line Beach. California State Route 1 runs through the park, where it intersects with the western terminus of the Mulholland Highway.  The  park was established in 1953.  It is named for actor and conservationist Leo Carrillo (1880–1961), who served on the State Parks commission.

History

The Woolsey Fire was a destructive wildfire that started inland many miles away and raced through canyons and mountains in Los Angeles and Ventura Counties to the coastline. The fire ignited on November 8, 2018 and burned  of land. The fire destroyed 1,643 structures, killed three people, and prompted the evacuation of more than 295,000 people. It was one of several fires in California that ignited on the same day.

The 2018 fire burned through almost the entire park. The equipment for the Junior Lifeguard program that was destroyed in the fire was replaced by a donation from a group of Australian surf lifeguard associations, led by the Maroochydore Surf Life Saving Club. The campgrounds reopened after work crews spent seven months removing debris and cleaning up.

Recreation
Leo Carrillo State Park offers swimming, surfing, windsurfing, surf fishing, and beachcombing.  Beachgoers can explore tide pools, sea caves, and reefs. Inland there is a campground and backcountry hiking trails.

In popular culture

Actors such as Elvis Presley, Jerry Lewis, Nancy Sinatra, Dick Clark and other celebrities have been featured in films shot here.

In the popular 1970s TV show The Rockford Files, starring James Garner, it was the first season's opening scene of episode 1 (The Kirkoff Case) airing September 13, 1974.

It was featured in an episode of Huell Howser's TV series California's Golden Parks.

During the final scenes of the Tom Petty's "Mary Jane's Last Dance" music video, Petty is seen carrying Kim Basinger through a cave before placing her in the water.

In Better Call Saul, it was featured in the final season during the opening of the episode “Point and Shoot”. This sequence is thus far the only scene from the “Breaking Bad” universe not to be shot in New Mexico.

In ‘’The Big Lebowski’’, it was mentioned by Walter Sobchak John Goodman during the eulogy of Donald Theodore Kerabatsos Steve Buscemi as one of the many places Donny surfed.

Other movies filmed here include:

 Gidget (1959)
 Beach Blanket Bingo (1965)
 Grease (1978)
Journey to the Center of the Earth (1959)
50 First Dates (2004)
 Psycho Beach Party (2000)
 The Truth About Cats & Dogs (1996)
 The Usual Suspects (1995)
 Sylvia Scarlett (1935)
 Attack of the Crab Monsters (1957)
 Monster From The Surf (1965)
 Jack the Giant Killer (1962)
 The Craft (1996).
 That Thing You Do! (1996)
 Cast Away (2000)
 Orange County (2002)
 She's All That (1999)
 The Karate Kid (1984)
 Letters from Iwo Jima (2006)
 Slave Girl (1947)
 Trader Tom of the China Seas (1954)
 Viking Women and the Sea Serpent (1957)
 Furious 7 (2015)
 The Mentalist (2008–2015)

See also

List of beaches in California
List of California state parks

References

External links 

 Leo Carrillo State Park
 Santa Monica Mountains National Recreation Area

1953 establishments in California
Beaches of Los Angeles County, California
Beaches of Ventura County, California
Malibu, California
Mulholland Highway
Parks in Los Angeles County, California
Parks in Ventura County, California
Protected areas established in 1953
Santa Monica Mountains
Santa Monica Mountains National Recreation Area
State parks of California
Surfing locations in California
Tourist attractions in Malibu, California